Mathias Dahl Sauer (born 2 April 2004) is a Danish footballer who plays as an attacking midfielder for the U-19 squad of Danish Superliga club AGF.

Career

AGF
Sauer started playing football at Thorsager Rønde IF (TRIF). He later moved to AGF and then played for Silkeborg IF, before returning to AGF again in July 2019. After returning, 16-year old Sauer became a established played for the U-19 team, although his young age.

Sauer did well with the U19s, which earned him his professional debut on 24 May 2021 - just over a month after his 17th birthday - in the Danish Superliga against FC Midtjylland, where he came on from the bench, playing the last 11 minutes of the game.

References

External links

Mathias Sauer at DBU

2004 births
Living people
Danish men's footballers
Association football midfielders
Denmark youth international footballers
Danish Superliga players
Silkeborg IF players
Aarhus Gymnastikforening players